The enzyme  erythro-3-hydroxyaspartate ammonia-lyase (EC 4.3.1.20) catalyzes the chemical reaction

erythro-3-hydroxy-L-aspartate  oxaloacetate + NH3

This enzyme belongs to the family of lyases, specifically ammonia lyases, which cleave carbon-nitrogen bonds.  The systematic name of this enzyme class is ''erythro-3-hydroxy-L-aspartate ammonia-lyase (oxaloacetate-forming). Other names in common use include erythro-β-hydroxyaspartate dehydratase, erythro-3-hydroxyaspartate dehydratase, erythro-3-hydroxy-Ls-aspartate hydro-lyase (deaminating); erythro''-3-hydroxy-Ls-aspartate ammonia-lyase.  It employs one cofactor, pyridoxal phosphate.

References

 

EC 4.3.1
Pyridoxal phosphate enzymes
Enzymes of unknown structure